Júlio Duarte Langa (born 27 October 1927) is a prelate of the Catholic Church. He was bishop of Xai-Xai from 24 October 1976 until 12 July 2004. He was made a cardinal in 2015.

Education
Júlio Duarte Langa was born on 27 October 1927 in Mangunze, in Gaza Province. He attended the local school before entering the Seminary of Magude. He then studied at the Seminary of Namaacha, in the Archdiocese of Lourenço Marques.

He was ordained a priest of the Archdiocese of Lourenço Marques on 9 June 1957.

On 31 May 1976, Pope Paul VI named him the second bishop of João Belo, which had been created in 1970. On 1 October 1976, the Diocese of João Belo was renamed the Diocese of Xai-Xai, so that when Duarte Langa was consecrated a bishop on 24 October 1976 by the archbishop of Lourenço Marques Alexandre José Maria dos Santos, he became Bishop of Xia-Xia.

Pope John Paul II accepted his resignation as bishop on 12 July 2004.

On 4 January 2015, Pope Francis announced that he would make him a cardinal on 14 February. At that ceremony, he was assigned the titular church of San Gabriele dell'Addolorata. He was one of five new cardinals too old to participate in a papal election whom Pope Francis said were "distinguished for their pastoral charity in service to the Holy See and the Church", chosen for their "pastoral solicitude". He was the second member of the College of Cardinals born in Mozambique, after Alexandre José Maria dos Santos.

See also
 Cardinals created by Pope Francis

References

Additional sources

External links

 

1927 births
Living people
People from Gaza Province
Mozambican cardinals
Cardinals created by Pope Francis
20th-century Roman Catholic bishops in Mozambique
Roman Catholic bishops of Xai-Xai